Zilzer is a surname. Notable people with the surname include:

 Anton Zilzer (1860–1921), Hungarian painter
 Max Zilzer (1868–1943), Hungarian-born German actor
 Wolfgang Zilzer (1901–1991), German-American actor, son of Max

See also
 Ziller (surname)

German-language surnames